The W.W. Hutchison Medal is a scientific award given by the Geological Association of Canada and named after William W. Hutchison in recognition of his many contributions to the Association and to Canadian and international geoscience. The medal is awarded to a young individual for recent exceptional advances in Canadian earth science research. Prior to 2004 the award was called the Past-Presidents' Medal.

Recipients

Source: GAC

See also

 List of geology awards

References

Geoscience Lecture tours

Canadian science and technology awards
Geology awards